Kyle Anderson may refer to:

 Kyle Anderson (basketball) (born 1993), American basketball player
 Kyle Anderson (darts player) (1987–2021), Australian darts player
 Kyle Anderson (singer), member of the Irish band Six